The 2004 Rally Finland (formally the 54th Neste Rally Finland) was the ninth round of the 2004 World Rally Championship season and was held between 6 and 8 August 2004. The rally was based in Jyväskylä. Peugeot's Marcus Grönholm won the race, his 16th win in the World Rally Championship.

Background

Entry list

Itinerary
All dates and times are EEST (UTC+3).

Results

Overall

World Rally Cars

Classification

Special stages

Championship standings

Junior World Rally Championship

Classification

Special stages

Championship standings

References

External links 

 Official website of the World Rally Championship
 2004 Rally Finland at Rallye-info 

Rally Finland
Finland
Rally